Deh-e Seyyed is a village in Lorestan Province, Iran.

Deh-e Seyyed may also refer to:
 Deh-e Seyyed Ahmad, Khuzestan Province